The 1893 All-Ireland Senior Football Championship Final was the sixth All-Ireland Final and the deciding match of the 1893 All-Ireland Senior Football Championship, an inter-county Gaelic football tournament for the top teams in Ireland. 

Wexford were represented by Young Irelands, a club based in the Selskar area of Wexford town, while Cork were represented by Dromtariffe.

Wexford led 1-1 to 0-1 early in the second half, when a pitch invasion began and several players were injured. The referee tried to restart the game with substitutes to replace injured players, but Cork refused. Wexford were awarded the title.

Cork and Wexford did not meet again in the Championship until 2010.

References

Gaelic football
All-Ireland Senior Football Championship Finals
Cork county football team matches
Wexford county football team matches